Talking blues is a form of folk music and country music. It is characterized by rhythmic speech or near-speech where the melody is free, but the rhythm is strict.

Christopher Allen Bouchillon, billed as "The Talking Comedian of the South", is credited with creating the "talking blues" form with the song "Talking Blues", recorded for Columbia Records in Atlanta in 1926, from which the style gets its name. The song was released in 1927, followed by a sequel, "New Talking Blues", in 1928. His song "Born in Hard Luck" is similar in style.

Overview
A talking blues typically consists of a repetitive guitar line utilizing a three chord progression which, although it is called a "blues", is not actually a twelve bar blues. The vocals are sung in a rhythmic, flat tone, very near to a speaking voice, and take the form of rhyming couplets. At the end of each verse, consisting of two couplets, the singer continues to talk, adding a fifth line consisting of an irregular, generally unrhymed, and unspecified number of bars, often with a pause in the middle of the line, before resuming the strict chordal structure. This example, from "Talking Blues" by Woody Guthrie, a cover of "New Talking Blues" by Bouchillon, serves to explain the format:

The lyrics to a talking blues are characterized by dry, rural humor, with the spoken codetta often adding a wry commentary on the subject of the verse, like Bob Dylan's "Talkin' Bear Mountain Picnic Massacre Blues".

Development of the genre
Woody Guthrie and his song "Talking Hard Work" is a title-tribute to Bouchillon's "Talking Blues" and "Born in Hard Luck".

The "Talking Blues" begins with the line:

Several sources of the 1940s–1950s, including the Almanac Singers, wrongly credited Guthrie as the creator of the talking blues. By the 1940s, what had started as a comedic country music genre became a more pronounced form of wry political protest singing. This sample lyric, from "Talking Union" by Pete Seeger, Lee Hays, and Millard Lampell shows the development of the genre into a vehicle for political commentary:

In 1958, the musician and folk music scholar John Greenway recorded an album collection called "Talking Blues" on the Folkways label. His compendium included 15 talking blues songs by Guthrie, Tom Glazer, and others, and was, according to the music historian Manfred Helfert, the "obvious source" for the many 1960s forays into the genre by Bob Dylan. Bob Dylan recorded "Talking World War III Blues" in 1963.

Dylan's fame and his repeated use of the talking blues form contributed to the genre becoming a widely popular vehicle for the composition of songs with political content. When the country singer Johnny Cash recorded a song that described his trip to Vietnam with his wife June Carter Cash, he chose the talking blues format to describe his dissent against the Vietnam War.

Talking blues is also popular as a medium for parody, as in "Like a Lamb to the Slaughter", Frank Hayes's talking-blues parody of Matty Groves:

Notable examples
 "Talking Blues" (1926) and "New Talking Blues" (1928) by Christopher Allen Bouchillon.
 "Talking Dust Bowl Blues" (1940), "Talking Fishing Blues", "Talking Centralia", "Talking Columbia", "Talking Hard Work", "Talking Sailor", and "Talking Subway" by Woody Guthrie.
 "Talking Union," by Pete Seeger, Lee Hays, and Millard Lampell.
 "Atomic Talking Blues" (a.k.a. "Talking Atom", "Old Man Atom") by Vern Partlow.
 "Talking Inflation Blues" by Tom Glazer.
 "Talking World War III Blues" (1963), "Talking New York", "Talking Hava Negiliah Blues", "Talkin' John Birch Paranoid Blues", "I Shall Be Free No. 10", and "Talkin' Bear Mountain Picnic Massacre Blues" by Bob Dylan, all recorded during the 1960s.
 "Guitar Man (1967) by Jerry Reed, made famous by Elvis Presley.
 "Talkin' Candy Bar Blues" by Peter, Paul & Mary on A Song Will Rise (1965).
 "Singing in Viet Nam Talking Blues" by Johnny Cash.
 "Talking Birmingham Jam" (1963), "Talking Airplane Disaster" (1963), "Talking Cuban Crisis" (1963), "Talking Vietnam (1964) by Phil Ochs.
 "Talking Thunderbird Blues" (1973), "Fraternity Blues" (1977) by Townes Van Zandt.
 "Talking New Bob Dylan" by Loudon Wainwright III on his album History (1992).

See also
 Bob and wheel
 Hip hop music
 Rapping
 Recitation song
 Spoken word
 Sprechgesang
 Talking Timbuktu

References

Further reading 
 van der Merwe, Peter (1989). Origins of the Popular Style: The Antecedents of Twentieth-Century Popular Music. Oxford: Clarendon Press. .

Country music genres